Kevin Krawietz and Andreas Mies were the defending champions but chose not to defend their title.

Ken Skupski and John-Patrick Smith won the title after defeating Sander Arends and Roman Jebavý 7–6(7–2), 6–4 in the final.

Seeds

Draw

References

External links
 Main draw

Challenger Eckental - Doubles
2019 Doubles